Cyprus is scheduled to compete at the 2019 European Games, in Minsk, Belarus from 21 to 30 June 2019. Cyprus has previously competed at the 2015 European Games in Baku, Azerbaijan, where it won 1 silver medal.

Medalists

Archery

Recurve

Compound

Badminton

References

Nations at the 2019 European Games
European Games
2019